United Nations Security Council resolution 1532, adopted unanimously on 12 March 2004, after recalling all previous resolutions on the situation in Liberia and West Africa, including Resolution 1521 (2003), the council froze the assets of former president Charles Taylor, his family and other associates.

Charles Taylor, who was exiled from the country, was accused of using misappropriated funds to interfere in Liberian affairs.

Resolution

Observations
The Security Council was concerned at the actions and policies of former Liberian president Charles Taylor, particularly the depletion and removal of the country's natural resources that undermined the country's transition to democracy. It stressed the need to return the misappropriated funds and assets to Liberia by the international community and expressed concern that Charles Taylor and associates still had control over them.

Acts
Acting under Chapter VII of the United Nations Charter, the council the assets of Charles Taylor, his wife and his son Charles McArther Emmanuel in addition to associates and members of the regime were frozen, aside from humanitarian exceptions. Other sanctioned individuals were to be determined by the committee established in Resolution 1521. The committee was asked to identify and update assets or resources controlled by Charles Taylor his close associates and to post such information on its website. The measures would be reviewed by 22 December 2004.

Finally, the resolution expressed the council's intention to consider whether or how to make the frozen funds available to benefit the Liberian people, once the new Liberian government had established transparent accounting and auditing mechanisms. Taylor's funds within Liberia were frozen in mid-October 2004.

See also
 List of United Nations Security Council Resolutions 1501 to 1600 (2003–2005)
 Second Liberian Civil War

References

External links
 
Text of the Resolution at undocs.org

 1532
 1532
2004 in Liberia
March 2004 events